Mauricio is a Spanish and Portuguese masculine given name, equivalent to English Maurice and derived from the Roman Mauritius. It is of Latin origin, and its meaning is "dark-skinned, Moorish".

The following are the equivalents in other languages:
Maurice, English
Morris, English
Mauricio, Spanish
Maurício, Portuguese
Maurice, French
Moritz, German
Maurizio, Italian
Maurits, Dutch

People
Mauricio Borensztein (1927–1996), Argentine comedian known on stage as "Tato Bores"
Mauricio Carlos de Onís y Mercklein (1790–1861), Spanish politician and diplomat
Mauricio Cienfuegos (born 1968), El Salvadoran footballer
Mauricio Funes (born 1959), president of El Salvador from 2009 to 2014
Mauricio Galguera (born 1958), Mexican painter
Mauricio González-Gordon y Diez (1923–2013), Spanish sherry maker and conservationist
Mauricio Hadad (born 1971), Colombian tennis player
Mauricio Islas (born 1973), Mexican actor
Mauricio Kagel (1931–2008), German-Argentinean composer 
Mauricio Lomonte (born 1982), Cuban radio announcer and television host
Mauricio Macri (born 1959), president of Argentina
Mauricio Ortega (athlete) (born 1994), Colombian discus thrower
Mauricio Ortega (cyclist) (born 1980), Colombian road cyclist
Mauricio Pochettino (born 1972), football coach
Mauricio Pellegrino (born 1971), Argentine retired footballer and manager
Mauricio Pinilla (born 1984), Chilean footballer
Mauricio Soler (born 1983), Colombian professional road bicycle racer
Maurício Rua (born 1981), Brazilian mixed martial arts fighter
Mauricio de Zúñiga (died 1816), Spanish Governor of La Florida in 1812–1813 and 1816
Mauricio de Sousa (born 1935), Brazilian cartoonist
Mauricio de María y Campos (born 1943), Mexican ambassador
Mauricio Macri (born 1959) President of Argentina from 2015 to 2019

References

Spanish masculine given names